Francis Henry King  (4 March 19233 July 2011) was a British novelist and short story writer. He worked for the British Council for 15 years, with positions in Europe and Japan.  For 25 years he was a chief book reviewer for the Sunday Telegraph, and for 10 years its theatre critic.

Early life and Council career
King was born on 4 March 1923 in Adelboden, Switzerland, to a father in the Indian Civil Service, brought up in British India and sent back to England when his father was dying. As a boy, he was shunted around among aunts and uncles.

He was educated at Shrewsbury School and Balliol College, Oxford. During the Second World War he was a conscientious objector and left Oxford to work on the land.

After completing his degree in 1949, King worked for the British Council. His positions with them took him to Italy, Salonika, and finally Kyoto. While he was in Greece he met the uninhibited writer Anne Cumming, who was also working for the British Council. She enjoyed observing his homosexual adventures. In 1964 he resigned to write full-time, by when he had already published nine novels, as well as poetry and a memoir.

Literary career
He won the W. Somerset Maugham Prize for his novel The Dividing Stream (1951) and also won the Katherine Mansfield Short Story Prize. In 2000, he was awarded the Golden PEN Award by English PEN for "a Lifetime's Distinguished Service to Literature".

His 1956 book The Firewalkers was published pseudonymously under the name Frank Cauldwell.

From 1986 to 1989 he was President of PEN International, the worldwide association of writers and oldest human rights organisation. He was a Fellow of the Royal Society of Literature, and was appointed an Officer (OBE) of the Order of the British Empire in 1979 and a Commander of the Order (CBE) in 1985. In 2003, his novel The Nick of Time was long-listed for the Man Booker Prize.

Personal life
King came out as homosexual in the 1970s.  After his long-term partner had died from AIDS in 1988, he described their relationship in Yesterday Came Suddenly (1993).  King suffered a stroke in 2005.

Death
Francis King died on 3 July 2011, at the age of 88.

Works
To the Dark Tower (1946) - novel
Never Again (1948) - novel
An Air That Kills (1948) - novel
The Dividing Stream (1951) - novel (winner of the Somerset Maugham Award)
Rod of Incantation (1952) - poems
The Dark Glasses (1954) - novel
The Firewalkers: a Memoir (1956) (written under the name Frank Cauldwell)
The Man on the Rock (1957) - novel
The Widow (1957) - novel
So Hurt and Humiliated (1959) - short story collection (#1 of 4)
The Custom House (1961) - novel
The Japanese Umbrella and Other Stories (1964) - short story collection (#2 of 4)
The Last of the Pleasure Gardens (1965) - novel
The Waves Behind the Boat (1967) - novel
Robert de Montesquiou by Philippe Julian (1967) – translator, along with John Haylock
The Brighton Belle and Other Stories (1968) - short story collection (#3 of 4)
A Domestic Animal (1970) - novel (revised version of the suppressed 1969 edition)
Flights (1973) - novel
A Game of Patience (1974) - novel
The Needle (1975) - novel
E.M. Forster and his World (1978) – a biography of the author of A Passage to India and Howards End
Act of Darkness (1983) - novel
Voices in an Empty Room (1984) - novel
Frozen Music (1987) - novella
Visiting Cards (1990) - novel
Punishments (1989) - novel
The Ant Colony (1992) - novel
Yesterday Came Suddenly (1993) – autobiography
Ash on an old man's sleeve (1996) - novel
Dead Letters (1998) - novel
The Nick of Time (2002) novel
The Sunlight on the Garden (2005) – short story collection (#4 of 4)
With My Little Eye (2007) - novel
Cold Snap (2009) - novel

References

External links
Francis Henry King Papers along with first addition, and second addition at the Harry Ransom Center
"Obituary of Francis King", The Daily Telegraph, 5 July 2011
PEN International
Valancourt Books Dedication to Francis King

1923 births
2011 deaths
Alumni of Balliol College, Oxford
British conscientious objectors
British short story writers
Commanders of the Order of the British Empire
Fellows of the Royal Society of Literature
People educated at Shrewsbury School
English LGBT novelists
British male novelists
British male short story writers
20th-century British novelists
21st-century British novelists
20th-century British short story writers
21st-century British short story writers
20th-century English male writers
21st-century English male writers
Presidents of the English Centre of PEN